This is a list of ecoregions in California.

Terrestrial ecoregions
California is in the Nearctic realm. Ecoregions are listed by biome:

Temperate coniferous forests
 Eastern Cascades forests (Eastern Cascades Slopes and Foothills)
 Great Basin montane forests
 Klamath–Siskiyou forests (Klamath Mountains)
 Northern California coastal forests
 Sierra Nevada forests

Temperate grasslands, savannas, and shrublands
 California Central Valley grasslands

Mediterranean forests, woodlands, and shrub
 California coastal sage and chaparral
 California interior chaparral and woodlands
 California montane chaparral and woodlands

Deserts and xeric shrublands
 Great Basin shrub steppe
 Mojave Desert
 Snake–Columbia shrub steppe
 Sonoran Desert

Freshwater ecoregions
 Colorado
 Death Valley
 Lahontan
 Oregon Lakes
 Oregon & Northern California Coastal
 Southern California Coastal–Baja California
 Sacramento–San Joaquin

Marine ecoregions
 Northern California
 Southern California Bight

References

 
California